The Herz reaction, named after the chemist Richard Herz, is the chemical conversion of an aniline-derivative (1) to a so-called Herz salt (2) with disulfur dichloride, followed by hydrolysis of this Herz salt (2) to the corresponding sodium thiolate (3):

Applications

Benzothiadiazoles
The Herz salts hydrolyze to give aminothiophenols, which are suitable for diazotization, giving Benzothiadiazoles.

Benzothiazoles
The sodium thiolate can be converted to an intermediate zinc mercaptide with zinc sulfate, followed by reaction of the mercaptide with for instance benzoyl chloride, forming a 1,3-benzothiazole.

Dyes
Aniline 5 is converted to compound 6, in three steps; 
 conversion to an ortho-aminothiol through the Herz-reaction (aniline 5 and disulfur dichloride), followed by
 conversion to an ortho-aminoarylthioglycolacid and
 conversion of the aromatic amine function to a nitrile via the Sandmeyer reaction. 
 In a last step the nitrile is hydrolysed resulting in  6. This compound is converted to 7 via a ring-closing reaction and decarboxylation. 

The compound, (thioindoxyl, 7) is an important intermediate in the organic synthesis of some dyes. Condensation with acenaphthoquinone gives 8, a dye of the so-called Ciba-Scarlet type, while condensation of 7 with isatin results in the thio-Indigo dye 9.

References

Addition reactions
Heterocycle forming reactions
Name reactions